is a Japanese football player.

Club statistics
Updated to 23 February 2016.

References

External links

1986 births
Living people
University of Tsukuba alumni
Association football people from Okayama Prefecture
Japanese footballers
J1 League players
J2 League players
J3 League players
FC Gifu players
Oita Trinita players
Tochigi SC players
SC Sagamihara players
Association football defenders